Ora Township is one of sixteen townships in Jackson County, Illinois, USA. As of the 2010 census, its population was 514 and it contained 210 housing units.

Geography

Unincorporated towns
 Oraville at 
 Sato at 
(This list is based on USGS data and may include former settlements.)

Adjacent townships
 Vergennes Township (east)
 Somerset Township (southeast)
 Levan Township (south)
 Kinkaid Township (southwest)
 Bradley Township (west)

Cemeteries
The township contains these eight cemeteries: Birkner, Creek Paum, Ditzler, Graff, Joubert, King, Underwood and Williamson.

Major highways
  Illinois Route 4

Demographics

School districts
 Elverado Community Unit School District 196
 Trico Community Unit School District 176

Political districts
 Illinois' 12th congressional district
 State House District 115
 State Senate District 58

Notable person
Wayne Alstat (1934-2019), farmer and Illinois state representative, was born in Ora Township.

References
 
 United States Census Bureau 2007 TIGER/Line Shapefiles
 United States National Atlas

External links
 City-Data.com
 Illinois State Archives

Townships in Jackson County, Illinois
Townships in Illinois